Kenneth Dixon may refer to:
Kenneth Dixon (American football) (born 1994), American football running back
Ken Dixon (born 1960), American baseball pitcher
Ken Dixon (confectioner) (1929–2022), British confectioner